Patriarch Parthenius of Alexandria may refer to:

 Patriarch Parthenius I of Alexandria, Greek Patriarch of Alexandria in 1678–1688
 Parthenius II of Alexandria, Greek Patriarch of Alexandria in 1788–1805
 Patriarch Parthenius III of Alexandria, Greek Orthodox Patriarch of Alexandria in 1987–1996